Matias Omar Degra (born June 18, 1983) is an Argentine football player as a goalkeeper.

Club career

Asteras Tripolis
In 2009 Asteras signed Degra from Veria (2nd Division) and became the first choice goalkeeper of the team.

AEL Limassol
In 2011, he signed for AEL Limassol, helping the team to win the Cypriot First Division. He had the amazing record of saving 7 consecutive penalties in a whole year, helping the team have the best defensive record in the league. The next season started very well for Matias Degra and he participated in the group stages of the UEFA Europa League. At the end of the season, after his team lost in the Cypriot cup final, Degra did not renew his contract with AEL.

Paços Ferreira
In June 2013, he moved to Portugal and signed a contract with Paços Ferreira.

Sheriff Tiraspol
In June 2014, he signed a contract with Moldovan side Sheriff Tiraspol.

AEL 
In July 2016, he signed a contract with Greek team AEL (unaffiliated with AEL Cyprus). He made his debut on a friendly match against A.O.Kerkyra. On 12 September 2016, he made his official debut in a league match against Iraklis Thessaloniki (2-2). This was meant to be his last appearance in the club. After the game ended he had a very serious confrontation with the team's major shareholder Alexis Kougias at the entrance of the locker rooms. Kougias blamed him for having unprofessional behavior and poor performance. Also he claimed to have full responsibility for the second goal the team conceded, when he tried to dribble past 2 opponents, he lost the ball and the other team scored in an empty goal. Photos published later show Kougias hit Degra in the face. Hours later he solved his contract and left the club by mutual agreement.

Honours
AEL Limassol
Cypriot First Division: 2011-12
Moldova Cup : 2015
Cypriot Super Cup: 2015

References

External links
 
 

1983 births
Living people
Footballers from Córdoba, Argentina
Argentine footballers
Argentine expatriate footballers
Association football goalkeepers
Talleres de Córdoba footballers
9 de Julio de Morteros players
Apollon Pontou FC players
Veria F.C. players
Asteras Tripolis F.C. players
AEL Limassol players
F.C. Paços de Ferreira players
FC Sheriff Tiraspol players
Deportivo Pereira footballers
Club Atlético Alvarado players
Primeira Liga players
Cypriot First Division players
Moldovan Super Liga players
Categoría Primera B players
Primera Nacional players
Torneo Federal A players
Argentine expatriate sportspeople in Greece
Expatriate footballers in Greece
Argentine expatriate sportspeople in Cyprus
Expatriate footballers in Cyprus
Argentine expatriate sportspeople in Moldova
Expatriate footballers in Moldova
Argentine expatriate sportspeople in Portugal
Expatriate footballers in Portugal
Argentine expatriate sportspeople in Colombia
Expatriate footballers in Colombia